Iran has international borders with 13 sovereign countries, both on land and sea. It has a total of 5,894 km (3,662 mi) land borders with Iraq, Turkey, Azerbaijan, Armenia, Turkmenistan, Afghanistan, and Pakistan. With a total of 2,440 km coastline, it has maritime borders with 6 other countries: Kuwait, Saudi Arabia, Bahrain, Qatar, the United Arab Emirates, and Oman.

Land borders 
 Iran–Afghanistan border (921 km)
 Iran–Armenia border (44 km)
 Iran–Azerbaijan border (689 km)
 Iran–Iraq border (1,599 km)
 Iran–Pakistan border (959 km)
 Iran–Turkey border (534 km)
 Iran-Turkmenistan border (1,148 km)

References